Matthew Jones (born 1 September 1980 in Llanelli, Wales) is a Welsh former international footballer. He made his professional debut in the Premier League for Leeds United and played his last professional game for his home town club Llanelli in the Welsh Premier League. He has played centre-midfield for most of his career, though sometimes appeared at right back. He formerly played for Leeds United and Leicester City.

Playing career
Jones was born in Llanelli, Wales and joined the Leeds United Youth Academy in 1994 at the age of 14. Unable to establish himself as a first team regular he transferred to Leicester City in December 2000 for a fee of £3.5million. He scored one league goal, in a 2–1 home defeat to Middlesbrough on 17 September 2001.

Intended to be a replacement for Neil Lennon at Leicester City, manager Peter Taylor hailed Jones as the new Lennon, but his time with Leicester was littered with injuries. He spent a year out with a knee ligament injury received when tackling Gary McAllister in Liverpool's 1–0 win against Leicester in January 2002. In August 2003 he trained with Nottingham Forest, but on his return to Leicester three weeks later was ruled out, initially for four further months, with a back injury.

After numerous operations in a bid to recover Jones decided to retire in 2004 at the age of 23. His last international game for Wales was a 2–0 away defeat to USA in May 2003, receiving a red card during his 13th appearance.

In September 2007, Jones announced he would come out of retirement to play for Llanelli in the Welsh Premier League. Jones featured sporadically for Llanelli over 2 seasons, making 23 league appearances, scoring one goal and contributing while studying for his coaching qualifications by winning the Welsh Premier league for the first time in the club's history and furthering their success with a league cup final title completing the double that year. He has also added appearances in the Welsh Cup Final and the Champions League to his CV.

Coaching
In September 2021 Jones was appointed Manager of the Wales national under-21 football team having previously managed the Wales under-18 team.

Media
Since his playing retirement Jones worked within the sports media including appearances for BBC Sport, Sky Sports and John Barnes Soccer Night and has both written a column on the BBC Sport website and been featured as part of the BBC Wales website Raise your game series.

Personal
Jones has taken part in many marathons, including the London marathon and various charity events in the aid of his good friend, Gary Speed.

References

External links
The Matt Jones Column – BBC Online Sport

1980 births
Living people
Footballers from Llanelli
Wales international footballers
Welsh footballers
Welsh football managers
Leeds United F.C. players
Leicester City F.C. players
Llanelli Town A.F.C. players
Premier League players
Association football midfielders
Cymru Premier players
People educated at Boston Spa Academy